= Shan National Day =

Shan National Day (Burmese: ရှမ်းအမျိုးသားနေ့) also known as Shan State Day, is an annual observance celebrated on 7 February by the Shan people. It commemorates the political unity achieved by Shan leaders and representatives in 1947, during the period leading up to the independence of Burma.

== History ==
The observance originated during the Second Panglong Conference, held from 6 to 12 February 1947. The gathering brought together Shan princes (Sawbwas) alongside community representatives and delegates from other ethnic groups. On 7 February, Shan leaders agreed to form a unified council to represent their political future, a date later designated as Shan National Day.

Four days later, on 11 February 1947, Shan leaders formally adopted the Shan national flag—featuring horizontal stripes of yellow, green, and red—along with the Shan national anthem. During this meeting, they also officially confirmed 7 February as the date for annual commemorations.
